Kini and Adams is a 1997 Burkinabé drama film directed by Idrissa Ouedraogo. It was filmed in Zimbabwe in English.

Plot
Somewhere in southern Africa, in a huge region populated by poor peasants, two friends dream of a better life, far from their village, and decide to leave and make their dream come true. To leave, they attempt to repair an old car with second-hand spare parts, but their family and friends make fun of them. Little by little, their impetus dies down and so does their friendship. Finally, bitterness and jealousy put an end to the friendship between the two men and they become fierce enemies.

Cast
Vusi Kunene as Kini
David Mohloki as Adams
Nthati Moshesh as Aida
John Kani as Ben
Netsayi Chigwendere as Binja
Fidelis Cheza as Tapera
Sibongile Mlambo as Bongi

Reception
For this film Idrissa Ouedraogo was nominated for the Palme d'Or at the 1997 Cannes Film Festival and won the Jury prize at the 1998 Bermuda International Film Festival.

References

External links
 
 
 

1997 films
1997 drama films
Films directed by Idrissa Ouedraogo
Films set in Zimbabwe
Burkinabé independent films
Burkinabé drama films
French drama films
1990s English-language films
1990s French films